Kim Gwi-sik (born 16 February 1969) is a South Korean weightlifter. He competed at the 1988 Summer Olympics and the 1992 Summer Olympics.

References

1969 births
Living people
South Korean male weightlifters
Olympic weightlifters of South Korea
Weightlifters at the 1988 Summer Olympics
Weightlifters at the 1992 Summer Olympics
Place of birth missing (living people)
20th-century South Korean people